Vithika Sheru (born 2 February 1994) is an Indian actress who has appeared in Telugu, Tamil, and Kannada films. In 2019, she entered the reality TV show Bigg Boss Telugu 3 as a contestant.

Early life
Vithika Sheru was born on 2 February 1994, in Bhimavaram, Andhra Pradesh. She completed her education in Mumbai and Hyderabad. She pursued a graduate diploma in fashion design from the Lakhotia Institute of Design, Abids, Hyderabad.

Personal life
She is married to actor Varun Sandesh.

Career
Sheru started acting as a child artist at age 11, appearing in Telugu television series, and made her film debut at age 15 in the Kannada film Anthu Inthu Preethi Banthu. She stated that her Kannada debut happened by chance when she accompanied her aunt, who is a stylist, to the film sets where she was spotted and offered a role in the film. A remake of the Telugu film Aadavari Matalaku Ardhale Verule, she played the role that Swati Reddy played in the original, after which she appeared in another Kannada film Ullasa Utsaha.

She then went on to work in Telugu cinema. During 2008 and 2009, she starred under the name Keerthi in a few low budget Telugu films like Preminchu Rojullo, Chalo 123 and My Name is Amrutha. She later worked as a supporting actress in the films Jhummandi Naadam and Bheemili Kabaddi Jattu, before landing a lead role in the Telugu film Prema Ishq Kaadhal. She played the role of a college student in the film, for which she also did the complete costume styling. In 2014, she made her Tamil film debut with Uyir Mozhi, in which she played a visually challenged girl. To prepare for the role, she said, she had to learn Braille and was blindfolded for many days.

In 2015, she appeared as a lead in Paddanandi Premalo Mari directed by debutant Mahesh Upputuri. She played Shravani, a girl "who is both traditional and modern and changes her attitude depending on situations", and also designed her own costumes for the film. She has completed her second Tamil film Mahabalipuram. She also shot for a Tamil film titled Vedikkai along with Vidharth.

She has been the brand ambassador for brands like RK's Grand Mall, Bhargavi Fashions, Bhima Jewellery & Tasyaah.

Filmography

Television

References

External links 

Living people
Indian film actresses
Actresses from Andhra Pradesh
Actresses in Telugu cinema
Actresses in Tamil cinema
People from West Godavari district
21st-century Indian actresses
Actresses in Kannada cinema
Bigg Boss (Telugu TV series) contestants
1994 births